Pakpak, or Batak Dairi, is an Austronesian language of Sumatra. It is spoken in Dairi Regency, Pakpak Bharat Regency, Parlilitan district of Humbang Hasundutan Regency, Manduamas district of Central Tapanuli Regency, and Subulussalam and Aceh Singkil Regency.

Phonology

Consonants 

 A word-final /k/ can also be heard as a glottal stop .

Vowels 

 Vowels /i, u, e, o/ can have shortened allophones of [, ].

References

Further reading

 
 
 
 

Batak languages
Languages of Indonesia
Languages of Aceh